Ganister is an unincorporated community and census-designated place (CDP) in Blair County, Pennsylvania, United States. It was first listed as a CDP prior to the 2020 census.

The CDP is in eastern Blair County, in the northwestern part of Woodbury Township. It is bordered to the north by the Frankstown Branch Juniata River and to the west by its tributary, Piney Creek. Catharine Township is to the north across the Frankstown Branch.

Pennsylvania Route 866 forms the northeastern border of the Ganister CDP; it leads southeast (downriver)  to Williamsburg and northwest, upriver through the Lock Mountain / Short Mountain water gap,  to U.S. Route 22 near Point View.

The limestone quarry in Ganister is currently owned by Grannas Brothers, Inc.

Demographics

References 

Census-designated places in Blair County, Pennsylvania
Census-designated places in Pennsylvania